Israelite Bay is a bay and locality on the south coast of Western Australia. 

Situated in the Shire of Esperance local government area, it lies east of Esperance and the Cape Arid National Park, within the Nuytsland Nature Reserve and the Great Australian Bight.

Climate data was recorded at Israelite Bay from 1885 to 1927, and it is frequently mentioned in Bureau of Meteorology weather reports as a geographical marker.

It was the site of a significant telegraph station in the early 1900s. It was also a location serviced by the W.A. Government State Steamship Service, the South Coast Service, in the early 1900s.

The Eastern Group, the eastern-most islands of the Recherche Archipelago, identified by Matthew Flinders in January 1802, is offshore of Israelite Bay.

References

Further reading
 Esperance Council (1984) Israelite Bay management plan. Esperance, W.A : Esperance Shire Council

External links
- Geoscience Australia

Shire of Esperance
Bays of Western Australia
South coast of Western Australia
Great Australian Bight
Nuytsland Nature Reserve